Tetronic acid is a chemical compound, classified as a γ-lactone, with the molecular formula C4H4O3.

It interconverts between keto and enol tautomers:

Many natural products such as ascorbic acid (vitamin C), penicillic acid, pulvinic acids, and abyssomicins possess the β-keto-γ-butyrolactone motif of tetronic acid.

In organic synthesis, it is used as a precursor for other substituted and ring-fused furans and butenolides.  It is also forms the structural core of a class of pesticides, known as tetronic acid insecticides, which includes spirodiclofen and spiromesifen.

See also
 5-Hydroxy-2(5H)-furanone

References

Furanones